Farm to Market Road 1459 (FM 1459) is a farm to market road in Brazoria County, Texas.

Route description
FM 1459 begins at a blinking light, at the intersection of  FM 524 in the heart of Sweeny. Traveling along Second Street, the highway makes two 90 degree curves: one to the northwest, passing Sweeny Community Hospital, then to the northeast, leaving town in a northerly direction. It crosses  FM 522 and then  SH 35 to the southwest of West Columbia. FM 1459 turns to the northwest, passing small communities such as Camp Karankawa alongside the San Bernard River, to its northern end at  FM 1301 near Danciger.

History
FM 1459 was designated on July 22, 1949, from SH 35 to FM 524 in Sweeny. The northern extension from SH 35 to FM 1301 occurred on June 1, 1965.

Major intersections

References

1459
Transportation in Brazoria County, Texas